The Kiokee Baptist Church in Appling, Georgia is the oldest continuing Southern Baptist congregation in the state. The church building was built in 1808. Its founder, Daniel Marshall, was the first great Baptist leader in Georgia. Kiokee Baptist Church was listed on the National Register of Historic Places in 1978.

References

External links
 First Baptist Church in Georgia historical marker

Churches on the National Register of Historic Places in Georgia (U.S. state)
Churches completed in 1808
19th-century Baptist churches in the United States
Buildings and structures in Columbia County, Georgia
National Register of Historic Places in Columbia County, Georgia
Southern Baptist Convention churches